Red Dirt Road is the eighth studio album by American country music duo Brooks & Dunn, released in 2003 on Arista Nashville. Certified platinum for sales of one million copies in the U.S., the album produced three top ten singles: "Red Dirt Road" (#1 on the Hot Country Songs chart), "You Can't Take the Honky-Tonk out of the Girl" (#3) and "That's What She Gets for Lovin' Me" (#6). It is considered a concept album.

Background
"I knew we were going to call this album Red Dirt Road before the first song was even picked," said Ronnie Dunn. "I wanted that thread, that growing up in rural America and all the universal touchstones we all go through—that first beer, wrecking my first car two weeks after I got it, being taken to a revival by my cousins who lived a few miles farther down that road. That road ran through every major event in my young life… and who would think a kid growing up like that, going to Bible college, would end up here? But that's the power of life and roots and dreams—it can."

Track listing

Personnel
As listed in liner notes.

Brooks & Dunn
Kix Brooks – lead vocals, background vocals
Ronnie Dunn – lead vocals, background vocals, tambourine

Additional musicians

Robert Bailey – background vocals
Bekka Bramlett – background vocals
Pat Buchanan – electric guitar
Mark Casstevens – acoustic guitar
Perry Coleman – background vocals
J. T. Corenflos – electric guitar
Charlie Crowe – electric guitar
Eric Darken – percussion
Jerry Douglas – Dobro
Dan Dugmore – acoustic guitar, steel guitar, Dobro
Shannon Forrest – drums
Paul Franklin – steel guitar
Kenny Greenberg – acoustic guitar, electric guitar
Vicki Hampton – background vocals
Aubrey Haynie – fiddle
Wes Hightower – background vocals
Jim Hoke – harmonica, accordion
Clayton Ivey – piano
John Jorgenson – electric guitar
Bill Kenner – mandola
B. James Lowry – acoustic guitar
Brent Mason – electric guitar
Steve Nathan – piano, keyboard, Wurlitzer, Mellotron, Hammond B-3 organ
Michael Rhodes – bass guitar
John Wesley Ryles – background vocals
Harry Stinson – background vocals
Bryan Sutton – acoustic guitar, banjo, mandolin, National guitar
Crystal Taliefero – background vocals
Russell Terrell – background vocals
Lou Toomey – electric guitar
Dan Tyminski – background vocals
Christopher Willis – background vocals
Dennis Wilson – background vocals
Glenn Worf – bass guitar
Mark Wright – tambourine, background vocals
Reese Wynans – Hammond B-3 organ

Horns performed by Jeff Coffin, Jim Horn, Samuel Levine, and Steve Patrick, and arranged by Jim Horn.

Chart performance

Weekly charts

Year-end charts

Certifications

References

2003 albums
Brooks & Dunn albums
Arista Nashville albums
Albums produced by Mark Wright (record producer)